Global Conquest is a video game published by Microplay Software in 1992 for IBM PC compatibles. It is a version of Empire with numerous gameplay upgrades and a multi-player mode supported via modems.

Plot
Global Conquest is a strategy game where the object is to discover territories and conquer the world through strategy and management of military and economic resources.

The game always involves four opponents, which may be controlled by the computer or human players, and can be played via modem. The world is generated for every game, with the environment composed of oceans, plains, forests, swamps, or mountains, to which the players add units such as infantry, armor, subs, airplanes, battleships, and aircraft carriers. Players start with, and can manufacture, a spy unit that can not only steal secrets but can see with wide-ranging eyes. A player's Comcen is the most powerful piece, and a player is out of the game upon losing the Comcen. A player's collection of cities, also known as burbs, creates units and must then financially support them with money dumped into the treasury each turn.

As with Bunten's earlier game M.U.L.E., Global Conquest is designed to balance gameplay between players. Random events are adjusted so that the player in first place is never lucky and the last-place player is never unlucky.

Reception
In 1992 and 1994 surveys of science fiction games, Computer Gaming World gave Global Conquest four-plus stars out of five, stating that its "main strength is modem play coupled with detailed military operations". The magazine later named it one of 1992's best wargames. The game was reviewed in 1993 in Dragon #189 by Hartley, Patricia, and Kirk Lesser in "The Role of Computers" column. The reviewers gave the game 4 out of 5 stars.

Reviews
Computer Gaming World - Nov, 1992
ASM (Aktueller Software Markt) - Jul, 1992

References

External links
Global Conquest at MobyGames
Global Conquest at IGN
Global Conquest at GameSpy
Global Conquest at GameFAQs

1992 video games
Danielle Bunten Berry games
DOS games
DOS-only games
Microplay Software games
North America-exclusive video games
Ozark Softscape games
Strategy video games
Video games developed in the United States